Alberto Sebastian Torres de la Mota (20 February 1934 – 16 April 1999) was a Dominican Republic sprinter. He competed in the men's 100 metres at the 1964 Summer Olympics.

References

External links
 

1934 births
1999 deaths
Athletes (track and field) at the 1959 Pan American Games
Athletes (track and field) at the 1964 Summer Olympics
Athletes (track and field) at the 1968 Summer Olympics
Dominican Republic male sprinters
Olympic athletes of the Dominican Republic
Place of birth missing
Pan American Games competitors for the Dominican Republic